The Diocese of Dacia was a diocese of the later Roman Empire, in the area of modern western Bulgaria, central Serbia, Montenegro, northern Albania and northern North Macedonia. It was subordinate to the Praetorian prefecture of Illyricum. Its capital was at Serdica (modern Sofia).

History

Origin of the name

Emperor Aurelian (270-275), confronted with the secession of Gallia and Hispania from the empire since 260, with the advance of the Sassanids in Asia, and the devastations that the Carpians and the Goths had created in Moesia and Illyria, abandoned the province of Dacia created by Trajan and withdrew his troops altogether, fixing the Roman frontier at the Danube. A new Dacia Aureliana was organised south of the Danube out of central Moesia, with its capital at Serdica.

The abandonment of Dacia Traiana by the Romans is mentioned by Eutropius in his Breviarium historiae Romanae, book IX :

Creation

During the administrative reforms of Diocletian (284-305), the Diocese of Moesia was created, encompassing most of the central Balkans and the Greek peninsula. Later, however, probably in the time of Constantine the Great (306-337) the diocese was split in two, forming the Diocese of Macedonia in the south and the Diocese of Dacia, in the north.

The Diocese of Dacia was composed of five provinces: Dacia Mediterranea (the southern, interior portion of Dacia Aureliana), Dacia Ripensis (the northern, Danubian portion of Dacia Aureliana), Moesia Prima (the northern portion of Moesia Superior), Dardania (the southern portion of Moesia Superior) and Praevalitana (the eastern portion of Dalmatia).

The dioceses capital was at Serdica (modern Sofia). Administration of diocese was headed by a vicarius. According to the Notitia dignitatum (an early 5th century imperial chancery document), the vicarius had the rank of vir spectabilis.

The diocese was transferred to the Western Empire in 384 by Theodosius I, probably in partial compensation to the empress Justina for his recognition of the usurpation of Magnus Maximus in the Gallic Empire. However, upon his death in 395, it reverted to the Eastern Empire, forming, together with the Diocese of Macedonia to the south, the Praetorian prefecture of Illyricum.

In 535, under emperor Justinian I (527-565), ecclesiastical order on the territory of the diocese was reshaped, and new Archbishopric of Justiniana Prima was created, centered in emperor's birth city of Justiniana Prima. Newly appointed archbishop was given metropolitan jurisdiction over all provinces of the Diocese of Dacia.

Destruction
The territory of diocese was devastated by the Huns in the middle of 5th century and finally overrun by the Avars and Slavs in late 6th and early 7th century.

See also
 Diocese of Moesia
 Province of Moesia
 Province of Moesia Superior
 Inscriptions of Upper Moesia
 Battles of Viminacium

References

Sources

 Procopius. Edited by H. B. Dewing. 7 vols. Loeb Classical Library. Cambridge, Massachusetts: Harvard University Press and London, Hutchinson, 1914–40. Greek text and English translation.
 Maurice's Strategikon: Handbook of Byzantine Military Strategy. translated by George T. Dennis. Philadelphia 1984, Reprint 2001.

External links
  Inscriptions of Moesia Superior, University of Belgrade
 CITIES IN THE PROVINCES MOESIA SUPERIOR AND MOESIA INFERIOR 

Roman Dacia
Civil dioceses of the Roman Empire
Civil dioceses of the Byzantine Empire
Praetorian prefecture of Illyricum
Ancient history of the Balkans
Serbia in the Roman era
Byzantine Serbia
Montenegro in the Roman era
Bulgaria in the Roman era
North Macedonia in the Roman era